Pseudemoia rawlinsoni, also commonly known as the glossy grass skink and Rawlinson's window-eyed skink, is a species of lizard in the family Scincidae. The species is endemic to Australia.

Etymology
The specific name, rawlinsoni, is in honour of Australian herpetologist Peter Alan Rawlinson (1942–1991).

Geographic range
Native to southeastern Australia, P. rawlinsoni is found in New South Wales, South Australia, Tasmania, and Victoria.

Habitat
The preferred natural habitats of P. rawlinsoni are grassland and freshwater wetlands.

Reproduction
P. rawlinsoni is viviparous.

References

Further reading
Cogger HG (2014). Reptiles and Amphibians of Australia, Seventh Edition. Clayton, Victoria, Australia: CSIRO Publishing. xxx + 1,033 pp. .
Hutchinson MN, Donnellan SC (1988). "A new species of scincid lizard related to Leiolopisma entrecasteauxii, from southeastern Australia". Transactions of the Royal Society of South Australia 112 (4): 143–151. (Leiolopisma rawlinsoni, new species).
Hutchinson MN, Donnellan SC, Baverstock PR, Krieg M, Simms S, Burgin S (1990). "Immunological Relationships and Generic Revision of the Australian Lizards Assigned to the Genus Leiolopisma (Scincidae, Lygosominae)". Australian Journal of Zoology 38 (5): 535–554. (Pseudemoia rawlinsoni, new combination).
Wilson S, Swan G (2013). A Complete Guide to Reptiles of Australia, Fourth Edition. Sydney: New Holland Publishers. 522 pp. .

Pseudemoia
Reptiles described in 1988
Skinks of Australia
Endemic fauna of Australia
Taxa named by Mark Norman Hutchinson
Taxa named by Steve Donnellan (scientist)